The following is a list of episodes of the HBO comedy television series Eastbound & Down, which premiered on February 15, 2009. The show focuses on former major league pitcher Kenny Powers and his attempts to return to Major League Baseball.

Series overview 
{| class="wikitable plainrowheaders" style="text-align:center;"
|-
! colspan="2" rowspan="2" |Season
! rowspan="2" |Episodes
! colspan="2" |Originally aired
|-
! First aired
! Last aired
|-
| style="background:#FF7F00" |
| 1
| 6
| style="padding: 0 8px;"| February 15, 2009
| March 22, 2009
|-
| style="background:#005878" |
| 2
| 7
| September 26, 2010
| November 7, 2010
|-
| style="background:#8cb4d5" |
| 3
| 8
| February 19, 2012
| April 15, 2012
|-
| style="background:#CCCCFF" |
| 4
| 8
| September 29, 2013
| November 17, 2013
|-
|}

Episodes

Season 1 (2009)

Season 2 (2010)

Season 3 (2012)

Season 4 (2013)

References

Lists of American sitcom episodes